The Poseidon of Melos is a statue of Poseidon in the National Archaeological Museum, Athens (NAMA), with the inventory number 235, which is dated to the last quarter of the second century BC. It is believed to be dated back to the Hellenistic Period.

The statue was found in 1877 on the island of Melos. It is made of Parian marble and has a height of 2.35 metres, which makes it more than lifesize. The statue was found in several pieces, which have been reattached to one another. Portions of the left foot and of the himation are modern recreations. Parts of the nose, beard and hair are missing. 

The sea god is depicted naked to the waist in an awe-inspiring pose, with his muscular right arm raised, probably in order to hold a trident (now lost). His himation hangs around his hips, covering his legs and genitals; he holds it in place at his side with his left hand. His back is also partially covered; a bit of cloth lies, mysteriously suspended, on his left shoulder. His weight rests on his right leg, his left leg is left free. The musculature of his arms and his body generally are very finely worked. The head is slightly tilted to the left and his gaze is directed into the distance. There is a dolphin behind the statue to the right, which serves as an additional support for the weight of the statue. The pose is a standard one for Poseidon, Zeus and Hades.

Bibliography

External link

Archaeological discoveries in Greece
National Archaeological Museum, Athens
2nd-century BC sculptures
Marble sculptures in Greece
Sculptures in Athens
1877 archaeological discoveries
Sculptures of Poseidon
Milos